Iron Horse State Park, part of the Washington State Park System, is a  state park located in the Cascade Mountains and Yakima River Valley, between Cedar Falls on the west and the Columbia River on the east.

The park is contiguous with a rail trail that crosses Snoqualmie Pass.  The trail is located within the former right-of-way of The Milwaukee Road, officially the Chicago, Milwaukee, St. Paul and Pacific Railroad.  Most of the right-of-way between Cedar Falls and the Idaho border was acquired by the state, through a quitclaim deed, as a result of the railroad's 1977 bankruptcy. As part of the reorganization of the company, the railroad embargoed its lines west of Miles City, Montana, in 1980 and ceased service in Washington. The state acquired the land in the early 1980s and eventually converted the right-of-way west of the Columbia River into a  hiking, mountain biking, and horseback riding trail. The trail, known as the Palouse to Cascades State Park Trail, continues beyond Iron Horse State Park to the Idaho border. Iron Horse State Park contains the most developed portion of the trail.

At Cedar Falls, the west end of Iron Horse State Park, the Palouse to Cascades State Park Trail connects to the Snoqualmie Valley Trail of the King County Regional Trail System. The  Snoqualmie Valley Trail is built on a portion of the former Milwaukee Road branch line from Cedar Falls to Everett.

Recreation 
Like most rails-to-trails projects, Iron Horse is popular with hikers and cyclists. There are many trail heads across the state, most with modern facilities, ample parking for a less common trail, and even a handful of campgrounds.

The trail passes through mostly woodland, along lakes and waterfalls, and goes directly through the divide at the old Snoqualmie Tunnel. The park is easily accessible from I-90.

Iron Horse is popular for its scenery and its history, although it is less well-known than other nearby areas like the Alpine Lakes Wilderness or Snoqualmie Falls.

The park trail continues through the Town of South Cle Elum where the preserved Milwaukee Road depot and substation, as well as the remains of the rail yard are located. The depot, substation, and rail yard are listed in the National Register of Historic Places. There is a small museum in the depot. In Kittitas, the trail passes The Milwaukee Road depot and the ruins of one of the substations. That depot is also listed in the National Register of Historic Places. In addition to these buildings, other infrastructure remains, such as tunnels and bridges.

See also
List of rail trails
Northwest Railway Museum
Seattle, Lake Shore and Eastern Railway
Hyak, Washington

References

Bibliography 
 
 Prater, Yvonne (1981). Snoqualmie Pass: From Indian Trail to Interstate. Seattle: The Mountaineers.  .
 
   Wilma referenced Gordon R. Newell, So Fair A Dwelling Place: A History of Olympia and Thurston County, Washington (Olympia: The Olympia News Publishing Co., 1950), p. 27.

External links
Iron Horse State Park Trail Washington State Parks and Recreation Commission 
East Iron Horse State Park Map Washington State Parks and Recreation Commission 
West Iron Horse State Park Map Washington State Parks and Recreation Commission

Rail trails in Washington (state)
State parks of Washington (state)
Chicago, Milwaukee, St. Paul and Pacific Railroad
Parks in King County, Washington
Parks in Kittitas County, Washington